Zwierzyniec is a Polish word for an animal park. It may refer to the following places:
 Zwierzyniec, a town in Lublin Voivodeship (east Poland)
 Zwierzyniec Brewery, a brewery in that town, belonging to the company Browary Lubelskie
 Zwierzyniec, Kraków, a district of Kraków
Zwierzyniec, Greater Poland Voivodeship (west-central Poland)
Zwierzyniec, Kuyavian-Pomeranian Voivodeship (north-central Poland)
Zwierzyniec, Łódź Voivodeship (central Poland)
Zwierzyniec, Lower Silesian Voivodeship (south-west Poland)
Zwierzyniec, Krasnystaw County in Lublin Voivodeship (east Poland)
Zwierzyniec, Lubusz Voivodeship (west Poland)
Zwierzyniec, Kozienice County in Masovian Voivodeship (east-central Poland)
Zwierzyniec, Maków County in Masovian Voivodeship (east-central Poland)
Zwierzyniec, Wołomin County in Masovian Voivodeship (east-central Poland)
Zwierzyniec, Podlaskie Voivodeship (north-east Poland)
Zwierzyniec, Świętokrzyskie Voivodeship (south-central Poland)
Zwierzyniec, Lidzbark County in Warmian-Masurian Voivodeship (north Poland)
Zwierzyniec, Ostróda County in Warmian-Masurian Voivodeship (north Poland)
 Zwierzyniec, the Polish name for the Žvėrynas district of Vilnius